The Invitation is a thriller and horror film released on January 1, 2003.  It is rated R and runs approximately 1 hour and 25 minutes.  The movie was written and directed by Pat Bermel and stars Lance Henriksen, Christopher Shyer, Stellina Rusich, Stefanie von Pfetten, David Livingstone, Douglas O'Keeffe, Sarah-Jane Redmond, and Lideo Baldeon.

Plot summary 
Famous author Roland Levy holds a dinner party for his six closest friends on a private island, where he deliberately poisons them by lacing their food with it.  To receive the antidote, they must reveal their darkest secrets or take them to the grave.

References 

American horror thriller films
2003 horror films
2003 films
2000s American films